Aenne Brauksiepe (23 February 1912 – 1 January 1997) was a German politician of the CDU party. Her maiden name was Engels.

She joined the CDU in 1945, and became a member of the CDU-Bundesvorstand in 1956. From 1958 to 1971 she was the chief of CDU-women (Frauen-Union). Her highest job in the CDU party was as Deputy Chief of the CDU from 1967 to 1969.

She was a member of the Bundestag of West Germany from 1949 to 1972, during which time she represented the Cologne III district. For three years, from 1965 to 1968 she was the deputy leader of the CDU/CSU-Bundestagsfraktion. She was appointed Federal Minister for Family Affairs, Senior Citizens, Women and Youth in October 1968. She held this post until Chancellor Kurt Georg Kiesinger lost the election in 1969.

References

1912 births
1997 deaths
People from Duisburg
People from the Rhine Province
Federal government ministers of Germany
Female members of the Bundestag
Knights Commander of the Order of Merit of the Federal Republic of Germany
Women federal government ministers of Germany
20th-century German women politicians
Members of the Bundestag for North Rhine-Westphalia
Members of the Bundestag 1969–1972
Members of the Bundestag 1965–1969
Members of the Bundestag 1961–1965
Members of the Bundestag 1957–1961
Members of the Bundestag 1953–1957
Members of the Bundestag 1949–1953
Members of the Bundestag for the Christian Democratic Union of Germany